Charles de Ferriol (1652–1722) was a French ambassador sent by Louis XIV to the Ottoman Empire from 1692 to 1711, during the rule of Sultan Ahmed III.

A painting by Jean-Baptiste van Mour, who had accompanied him on his mission to Constantinople, shows his reception by the Sultan.

Ferriol is also known as the man who brought to France the epistolary writer Charlotte Aïssé, a Circassian slave he had bought in Constantinople. His alleged attempts to gain sexual favours from her, never confirmed by Aïssé herself, became the subject of numerous books and biographies, notably the Abbé Prévost's Histoire d’une Grecque moderne (1740).

See also
 French Ambassador to the Ottoman Empire
 Franco-Ottoman alliance

Notes

Ambassadors of France to the Ottoman Empire
1652 births
1722 deaths
17th-century French diplomats
18th-century French diplomats